Fleet Maneuvers (or 3D Fleet Maneuvers) is a closed-end, space-based play-by-mail (PBM) wargame.

History and development
Fleet Maneuvers was a computer-moderated, closed end, space-based play-by-mail game published by Fantastic Simulations.

Gameplay
The game's purpose was to score the most points from ship-to-ship combat. Games could end at 700 or 900 points, which took 10–20 turns. Players could choose from four races or factions: the Alliance, the Confederacy, the diminutive Donnz, and the warlike Krell. 

Fantastic Simulations also introduced a 3D variant called The Next Dimension.

Reception
Reviewer Keith Mercer, in the July–August 1987 issue of Paper Mayhem magazine stated that the game was challenging.

See also
 List of play-by-mail games

References

Bibliography

Further reading
 
 
 
 
 
 
 
 
 
 
 
 
 

Science fiction games
Multiplayer games
Play-by-mail games
Wargames